Glenn Joseph Hagel (born August 17, 1949) is a Canadian provincial and municipal politician. He was a Saskatchewan New Democratic Party member of the Legislative Assembly of Saskatchewan from 1986 to 2007, representing the constituencies of Moose Jaw North or Moose Jaw Palliser at different times during his career. He also served as Speaker of the Legislative Assembly from 1996 to 1999.

He was born in Drumheller, Alberta and was educated at the University of Manitoba and the University of Regina. Before entering politics, Hagel worked as a counsellor, educator and coordinator for a number of organizations. He married Karen Gifco and they have two daughters, Kristin and Meredith, and two granddaughters, Juliet and Nora.

Hagel served in the Saskatchewan cabinet as Minister of Post-Secondary Education and Skills Training, from 1999 to 2001, as Minister of Social Services from 2001 to 2003, as Minister of Gaming from 2002 to 2003 and from 2006 to 2007, as Minister of Community Resources and Employment in 2003, as Provincial Secretary from 2006 to 2007 and as Minister of Culture, Youth and Recreation from 2006 to 2007.

Provincially, Hagel's career apparently ended after being defeated by the Saskatchewan Party's Warren Michelson. Hagel is widely seen as losing his seat in the legislature due to a cover-up in the NDP caucus.

He was elected mayor of Moose Jaw in the 2009 Saskatchewan municipal elections, and retired in 2012, deciding not to run for another term.

References 

Living people
1949 births
Saskatchewan New Democratic Party MLAs
Speakers of the Legislative Assembly of Saskatchewan
Mayors of Moose Jaw
Members of the Executive Council of Saskatchewan
People from Drumheller
21st-century Canadian politicians